Federal Route 24, or Jalan Muar–Yong Peng, is a federal road in Johor, Malaysia. The roads connects Muar (Bandar Maharani) in the west to Yong Peng in the east. It is also a main route to North-South Expressway via Yong Peng Interchange.

Route background
The Kilometre Zero of the Federal Route 24 is located at Bulatan Bentayan roundabout in Muar (Bandar Maharani), at its interchange with the Federal Route 5, the main trunk road of the west coast of Peninsular Malaysia.

History

The Federal Route 24 is one of the earliest roads in the state of Johor. It was built in 1869 as a village road and was completed in 1870. Then the road was widened and straightened by Dato' Mohd. Salleh bin Perang (Dato 'Bentara Luar) in 1890. At that time, the Federal Route 24 holds the record as the longest straight and flat road in Malaya.

This road has a notable history especially during World War II.

Features
 Parit Sulong Historical Bridge (demolished in 1997)
 Parit Sulong War Memorial in Parit Sulong
 Siege of Bakri historical site
 Bakri Japanese war cemetery during Battle of Muar in World War II

At most sections, the Federal Route 24 was built under the JKR R5 road standard, with a speed limit of 90 km/h.

List of junctions and town

References

024